Samuel Haven could mean

Samuel Haven (judge), a judge from Dedham, Massachusetts
Samuel Foster Haven, his son, the archeologist